is a general term in Japanese cuisine for dipping sauces often used in grilling (yakitori and yakiniku, especially as teriyaki sauce) as well as with sushi, nabemono, and gyoza.  It can also be used to make the soup for ramen by combining it with stock and/or broth in order to add to the complex combination of flavors, and as a braising liquid for meat (e.g. chāshū).  

Ingredients for a Tare sauce will also include soy sauce, sake and/or mirin, sugar and/or honey, and optional ingredients include oyster sauce and ginger. Tare is traditionally made by mixing and heating soy sauce, sake and/or mirin, and sugar and/or honey. The sauce is boiled and reduced to the desired thickness, then used to marinate meat, which is then grilled or broiled, and the final dish may be garnished with spring onions.  

Kuromitsu is sweet tare.

See also
 Soy sauce
 Tonkatsu sauce
 Japanese Mayonnaise
 Japanese Worcestershire sauce

References

Japanese condiments
Sauces
Sushi